The 1938 Ashes series between Australia and England was drawn. England and Australia won a Test each, with two of the other Tests drawn and the third game of the series, scheduled for Manchester, abandoned without a ball being bowled, only the second instance of this in more than 60 years of Test cricket. The Australians retained The Ashes.

In all 30 first-class matches were played, and the Australian team won 15 of them losing only to England and H. D. G. Leveson-Gower's XI. There were also six minor games, the Australians winning five of them.

The touring team
DG Bradman (captain - SA)
SJ McCabe (vice-captain - NSW)
CL Badcock (SA)
SG Barnes (NSW)
BA Barnett (VIC)
WA Brown (QLD)
AG Chipperfield (NSW)
JHW Fingleton (NSW)
LO Fleetwood-Smith (VIC)
AL Hassett (VIC)
EL McCormick (VIC)
WJ O'Reilly (NSW)
MG Waite (SA)
CW Walker (SA)
FA Ward (SA)
ECS White (NSW)
Manager: Mr WH Jeanes

The team travelled to England on the P&O liner RMS Strathmore.

Test series summary

First Test

Second Test

Third Test

Fourth Test

Fifth Test

The England total of 903-7d is the highest Test innings total to feature a duck - Eddie Paynter was dismissed for 0.

Ceylon
The Australians had a stopover in Colombo en route to England and played a one-day single-innings match there against the Ceylon national team, which at that time did not have Test status.

References

External links
 CricketArchive – tour summaries

Annual reviews
 Wisden Cricketers' Almanack 1939

Further reading
 Bill Frindall, The Wisden Book of Test Cricket 1877-1978, Wisden, 1979
 Chris Harte, A History of Australian Cricket, Andre Deutsch, 1993

1938 in Australian cricket
1938 in English cricket
1938 in Ceylon
1938
1938
Sri Lankan cricket seasons from 1880–81 to 1971–72
International cricket competitions from 1918–19 to 1945
1938